Simo Halonen is a Finnish biathlete and world champion. He received a gold medal in 4 × 7.5 km relay at the 1975 Biathlon World Championships in Antholz. He received three times silver medals in the world championships with the Finnish relay team.

References

Finnish male biathletes
Living people
Biathlon World Championships medalists
Year of birth missing (living people)